Jamie Marc Tardif (born January 23, 1985) is a Canadian former professional ice hockey forward. Tardif played briefly in the National Hockey League (NHL) for the Boston Bruins appearing in two games.

Playing career
Tardif was drafted 112th overall in the 2003 NHL Entry Draft by the Calgary Flames. He played Junior with the Peterborough Petes of the Ontario Hockey League from 2001 to 2006. Unsigned from the Flames, Tardif re-entered the 2005 NHL Entry Draft and was passed over.

In the 2006–07 season, Tardif made his professional debut signing with the Toledo Storm of the ECHL. Through the duration of the season Tardif signed professional try-out contracts with the Manitoba Moose and Iowa Stars before finishing out the season with the Grand Rapids Griffins.

On July 26, 2007, Tardif signed with the Griffins for the 2007–08 season. On April 15, 2008, after scoring 17 goals and 34 points, Jamie then signed a two-year entry level contract with the Griffins NHL affiliate, the Detroit Red Wings.

Jamie re-signed with the Red Wings on August 8, 2010 to a two-way one-year contract.

On July 5, 2011, Tardif signed a two-year contract with the Boston Bruins. In the second year of his contract in the 2012–13 season, Tardif was recalled from the Bruins' AHL affiliate in Providence and made his NHL debut in his hometown Toronto, in a 1-0 victory over the Maple Leafs on February 2, 2013. Tardif was promoted after an injury to Brad Marchand.

On August 5, 2013, Tardif signed as a free agent to a one-year contract with the Buffalo Sabres. After participating in the Sabres training camp he was assigned to AHL affiliate, the Rochester Americans, where he posted 18 goals and 37 points in 51 games in the 2013–14 season.

Tardif left the Sabres organization in the off-season and on July 10, 2014, signed his first contract abroad on a one-year deal with German club, Adler Mannheim of the DEL.

Tardif enjoyed three seasons with Adler Mannheim before leaving as a free agent to return to North America. Approaching the tail end of his playing career, Tardif signed an ECHL contract to be a player/assistant coach with the Quad City Mallards of the ECHL on August 31, 2017. In the 2017–18 season, Tardif contributed with 32 points in 53 games. He played injured in the last ever regular season game of the Mallards, who had earlier announced they would cease operations, and announced his retirement after 12 professional years on April 7, 2018.

Career statistics

Regular season and Playoffs

International

References

External links

1985 births
Adler Mannheim players
Boston Bruins players
Calgary Flames draft picks
Canadian ice hockey forwards
Grand Rapids Griffins players
Ice hockey people from Ontario
Iowa Stars players
Living people
Manitoba Moose players
Peterborough Petes (ice hockey) players
Providence Bruins players
Quad City Mallards (ECHL) players
Rochester Americans players
Sportspeople from Welland
Toledo Storm players
Canadian expatriate ice hockey players in Germany